The Cosmopolitan Bowl was a one-time postseason college football bowl game held in December 1951 in Alexandria, Louisiana. The game featured McNeese State and Louisiana College. McNeese State won, 13–6.

Game result

References

Defunct college football bowls
McNeese Cowboys football bowl games
Sports in Alexandria, Louisiana
1951 in Louisiana